The Detroit Cardinals (also known as the Olympians) were an American basketball team based in Detroit, Michigan that was a member of the American Basketball League.

The team dropped out of the 1927–28 season on January 2, 1928, after their contract with Olympia Stadium was canceled due to poor attendance.

Year-by-year

References

Basketball teams in Detroit
1927 establishments in Michigan
1928 disestablishments in Michigan
Basketball teams established in 1927
Sports clubs disestablished in 1928